Japanese Historical Text Initiative (JHTI) is a searchable online database of Japanese historical documents and English translations. It is part of the Center for Japanese Studies at the University of California at Berkeley.

History
Delmer M. Brown started the process of establishing JHTI in 1998. The development of JHTI involved negotiations with the University of Tokyo Press and the National Institute of Japanese Literature.

Select list
JHTI is an expanding online collection of historical texts. The original version of every paragraph is cross-linked with an English translation. The original words in Japanese and English translation are on the same screen. There are seven categories of writings, including

Ancient chronicles
These works were compiled by officials of the Imperial Court at the command of the emperors.
 Kojiki (completed in 712 CE) with translation by Donald L. Philippi 
 Nihon Shoki (completed in 720) with translation by W. G. Aston 
 Shoku Nihongi (covering 697 to 791) with translation by J. B. Snellen 
 Kogo Shūi (completed in 807) with translation by Genchi Katō and Hikoshirō Hoshino

Ancient gazetteers
These records, Fudoki, were compiled by provincial officials according to imperial edicts during the first half of the 8th century.
  (submitted in 733) with translation by Michiko Aoki
  with translation by Michiko Aoki
  with translation by Michiko Aoki
  with translation by Michiko Aoki
  with translation by Michiko Aoki

Ancient kami-civil code
This was a compilation of religious law and civil law.
 Engishiki (927) with translation by Felicia Gressitt Bock

Medieval stories
These historical tales (monogatari) were about what was said and done by the prominent historical figures in aristocratic and military clans in feudal Japan
 Okagami (covering the years 866 to 1027) with translation by Helen Craig McCullough
 Yamato Monogatari (completed around 951) with translation by Mildred Tahara translation
 Eiga Monogatari (covering the years 794 to 1185) with translation by William H. McCullough & Helen Craig McCullough
 Taiheiki (completed around 1371) with translation by Helen Craig McCullough
 Azuma Kagami (completed around 1300) with partial translation by Minoru Shinoda

Medieval and early-modern histories
These three histories were written in ways that mirror the religious and political interests of their authors.
 Gukanshō (completed in 1219) with translation by Delmer M. Brown and Ichiro Ishida
 Jinnō Shōtōki (completed in 1339) with translation by H. Paul Varley
 Tokushi Yoron (completed in 1712) with translation by Joyce Ackroyd

State and Imperial Shinto
These works are about State Shinto and the Empire of Japan.
 
 Kokutai no Hongi (Cardinal Principles of Nation Polity, 1937) with translation by John Owen Gauntlett

Late-Edo period and Meiji period texts
This category is for miscellaneous writings which are from Japan's pre-modern and early-modern periods.

See also
 Aozora Bunko
 JSTOR

References

External links
 Japanese Historical Text Initiative
 National Institute of Japanese Literature
 Historiographical Institute, University of Tokyo
 Japanese Text Initiative, University of Virginia and University of Pittsburgh

University of California, Berkeley
Historiography of Japan